Ivaldi is a surname of Italian origin. Notable people with this surname include:

 Christian Ivaldi (born 1938), French pianist
 Ettore Ivaldi, Italian former slalom canoeist 
 Francesco Ivaldi (born 1977), Italian yacht racer who competed in the 2000 Summer Olympics
 Humberto Ivaldi (1909–1947), Panamanian painter and director of the National School of Painting in Panama City 
 Matteo Ivaldi (born 1971) is an Italian yacht racer who competed in the 1996 and in the 2000 Summer Olympics
 Michele Ivaldi (born 1970), Italian yacht racer who competed in the 1996 Summer Olympics
 Mickaël Ivaldi (born 1990), French Rugby Union player
 Raffaello Ivaldi (born 1997), Italian slalom canoeist
 Ferdinando "Sandro" Mussa-Ivaldi, Italian born professor at Northwestern University

Italian-language surnames